Leonardo di Maniago (1525 - 1601) was an Italian priest and historian.

He was born in Cividale del Friuli. He is known for his chronicle that includes events around the Council of Trent in 1543-1563 up until the year 1597. The book as published by Comino Ventura from Bergamo in 1597 and also published in Venice. He died in Maniago.

References

1525 births
1601 deaths
16th-century Italian writers
16th-century Italian historians